Sylvozh is a rural locality (a village) in Leninskoye Rural Settlement, Kudymkarsky District, Perm Krai, Russia. The population was 89 as of 2010. There are 5 streets.

Geography 
Sylvozh is located 37 km south of Kudymkar (the district's administrative centre) by road. Bagrova is the nearest rural locality.

References 

Rural localities in Kudymkarsky District